Mahalakshmi Menon, best known by her stagename Shobha (23 September 1962 – 1 May 1980), was an Indian actress best known for her work in Malayalam and Tamil films. At the age of 17, she won the National Film Award for Best Actress for her role in the 1979 Tamil film Pasi. She also received three Kerala State Film Awards: for Best Actress (1978), Best Supporting Actress (1977) and Best Child Artist (1971); and two Filmfare Awards South for Best Actress in Kannada (1978) and Tamil (1979) films. Considered one of the finest talents to have emerged in the Indian film world, her promising career was unexpectedly cut short as she committed suicide in 1980, due to unknown reasons. Her popularity resulted in considerable public scrutiny of the events that led to her death and also various conspiracy theories. The 1983 Malayalam film Lekhayude Maranam Oru Flashback is supposedly based on her life and death.

Born to Malayali parents in Madras, she started her career in the Tamil film industry, making her debut as a child artist in Thattungal Thirakkappadum (1966). Her first film as the main lead actress was in the 1978 Malayalam film Uthrada Rathri.

Early life
Shoba was born on 23 September 1962, to K. P. Menon and Prema Menonan actress credited by the mononym Prema, in the Malayalam film industry, from 1954 to 1981.

Career
In 1966, Shoba made her screen debut in Tamil thriller film Thattungal Thirakkappadum directed by actor J. P. Chandrababu. In the film she was credited as Baby Mahalakshmi where she played the role of Lakshmi opposite actress Savitri, K. R. Vijaya, R. S. Manohar and Chandrababu himself. The following year she made her debut in Malayalam cinema in P. Venu's Udhyogastha, where she was credited as Baby Shoba. The film has been touted as the first "multi-starrer" of Malayalam cinema, with such top actors as Sathyan, Prem Nazir, K. P. Ummer, Padmini, Sharada, Sheela and Rajasree; the huge hit, in a film targeted to all ages, brought Shoba wide attention as a child actor. 

In 1978 she was cast as a heroine in Uthrada Rathri, a film directed by Balachandra Menon. She received the Kerala government's Best Actress award for the 1978 films Bandhanam and Ente Neelakaasham. The same year she earned the Best Actress award by Filmfare for the Kannada cinema film Aparichita. In 1979 she received the National Award for Best Actress for the Tamil film Pasi, which was produced by Lalitha, the eldest of the Travancore sisters. She also received the Filmfare Best Actress award for Pasi and received the Second Best Actress award from the Kerala government in 1977 for the film Ormakal Marikkumo.

Death
Shobha committed suicide by hanging at the age of 17. She was married to Balu Mahendra. The 1983 Malayalam film Lekhayude Maranam Oru Flashback directed by K. G. George is loosely based on her life and death.

Filmography

Malayalam films

 Jeevithayaathra (1965)
 Karuna (1966)
 Penmakkal  (1966)
 Ollathu Mathi  (1967)
 Pareeksha  (1967)
 Kadal  (1968)
 Adyapika (1968)
 Aparadhini (1968)
 Kuruthikkalam (1969)
 Vettamrigam (1969)
 Udhyogastha (1967) – child artist
 Aval Alpam Vaikipoyi  (1971)
 Yogammullaval (1971)
 Sindooracheppu (1971) – Ammalu
 Makane Ninakku Vendi (1971) – Young Sophia
 Taxi Car (1972)
 Gandharavakshetram (1972) – Young Lakshmi
 Aradimanninte Janmi (1972) – Minikutty
 Udayam (1973) – Young Geetha 
 Badradeepam (1973) – Lekha
 Ayalathe Sundari (1974) – Shobha 
 Night Duty (1974) – Ammini
 Ayodhya (1975) – Shanthi
 Chottanikkara Amma (1976)
 Amruthavahini (1976) – Rani
 Dweep (1977)
 Ormakal Marikkumo (1977) – Ammini/Parvathi
 Nurayum Pathayum (1977)
 Rajaparambara  (1977)
 Pad–aram  (1978) – Shoba
 Randu Penkuttikal (1978)
 Wayanadan Thampan (1978)
 Utradaraatri (1978)
 Ulkkadal (1978)
 Ekakini (1978)
 Bandhanam (1978)
 Lillyppookkal (1979)
 Ishta Praneshwari (1979)
 Ente Neelakasham (1979)
 Shalini Ente Koottukaari (1980)
 Daliapookkal (1980)
 Aniyatha Valakal (1980)
 Soorya Daham (1980)
 Yovvanam Daham (1980)
 Manju Moodal Manju (1980)

Tamil films

 Naanal (1965) – child artist
 Thattungal Thirakkappadum (1966) – child artist
 Iru Kodugal (1969) – child artist
 Punnagai (1971)
 Vairam (1974)
 Achchani (1978)
 Nizhal Nijamagiradhu (1978)
 Oru Veedu Oru Ulagam (1978)
 Mullum Malarum (1978)
 Veetuku Veedu Vasappadi (1979)
 Oru Vidukadhai Oru Thodarkadhai (1979)
 Enippadigal (1979)
 Chakkalathi (1979)
 Agal Vilakku (1979)
 Azhiyatha Kolangal (1979)
 Pasi (1979)
 Veli Thandiya Velladu (1980)
 Moodu Pani (1980)
 Ponnagaram (1980)
 Saamanthippoo (1980)
 Mayil (1981) – Released posthumously
 Vaadagai Veedu (1981) – Released posthumously
 Anbulla Athan (1981) – Released posthumously

Telugu films
 Tharam Marindi (1977)
 Manavoori Pandavulu (1978)

Kannada films
 Kokila (1977)
 Aparichita (1978)
 Amara Madhura Prema (1982 – Released posthumously)

Awards
National Film Awards
 1979 – National Film Award for Best Actress for Pasi

Filmfare Awards South
 1978 – Filmfare Best Kannada Actress Award for Aparichita
 1979 – Filmfare Best Tamil Actress Award for Pasi

Kerala State Film Award
 1971 – Best Female Child Artist for Yogammullaval and Aval Alpam Vaikippoyi
 1977 – Second Best Actress for Ormakal Marikkumo
 1978 – Best Actress for Ente Neelakasham

References

Further reading

External links
 

1962 births
1980 deaths
Kerala State Film Award winners
Best Actress National Film Award winners
Actresses from Kerala
Actresses in Malayalam cinema
Indian film actresses
Actresses in Tamil cinema
Filmfare Awards South winners
20th-century Indian actresses
Actresses in Telugu cinema
Indian child actresses
Actresses in Kannada cinema
Suicides by hanging in India
1980 suicides
Child actresses in Malayalam cinema
Artists who committed suicide